Christin Zenner (born March 18, 1991 in Plauen, Saxony) is a German swimmer, who specialized in backstroke events. She is a two-time champion in the 50 m backstroke at the European Junior Swimming Championships (2006 in Palma de Mallorca, Spain and 2007 in Antwerp, Belgium). Zenner is also a member of the swimming team for VfV Hildesheim, and is coached and trained by her mother Jacqueline Zenner.

Zenner qualified for two swimming events, as Germany's youngest swimmer (aged 17), at the 2008 Summer Olympics in Beijing, by storming victories in the 100 and 200 m backstroke from the Olympic trials, in FINA A-standard entry times of 1:01.24  and 2:12.61. In the 100 m backstroke, Zenner challenged seven other swimmers on the sixth heat, including heavy favorites Reiko Nakamura of Japan and Laure Manaudou of France. She rounded out the field to last place and forty-second overall by one second behind Ukraine's Iryna Amshennikova in 1:03.87. In her second event, 200 m backstroke, Zenner finished thirty-fourth overall in the preliminary heats with a slowest time of 2:20.28.

References

External links
NBC Olympics Profile

1991 births
Living people
German female swimmers
Olympic swimmers of Germany
Swimmers at the 2008 Summer Olympics
Female backstroke swimmers
People from Plauen
Sportspeople from Saxony